Mikhail Nikolayevich von Giers (alternatively styled Mikhail Nikolaevich von Giers or Mikhail Nikolayevich de Giers) (1856–1924) was an Imperial Russian ambassador and the son of Russian Foreign Minister Nikolay Girs.

Career
Giers served as the Imperial Russian ambassador to Romania from 1902 to 1912 before transferring to perform the role in the Ottoman Empire. His conservative approach to diplomacy and abidance to protocol meant he could do little to stem increasing German influence on the Ottoman Porte. In the lead up to the Black Sea Raid, Giers maintained a network of informants in the Ottoman government. Giers was withdrawn from Constantinople on 31 October, 1914, shortly before the Russian declaration of war on the Empire. From 1915 to 1917 he was the Russian ambassador to Italy.

He is buried in Batignolles Cemetery in Paris.

References

Ambassadors of the Russian Empire to the Ottoman Empire
1856 births
1924 deaths
Russian military personnel of the Russo-Turkish War (1877–1878)
Ambassadors of the Russian Empire to Brazil
Privy Councillor (Russian Empire)
Ambassadors of the Russian Empire to Italy
Ambassadors of the Russian Empire to China
Ambassadors of the Russian Empire to Romania